There's Something for Everyone in America is the debut album by American guitarist Duck Baker. It was released in 1975 and reissued by Stefan Grossman's Guitar Workshop.

Track listing
 "The Jackson Stomp" (Traditional)
 "The Mission Street Blues" (W. C. Handy)
 "Allegheny County" (Duck Baker, Dan McCorison)
 "Matty Powell"
 "Zebra Blues"
 "Wolverines Blues" (Jelly Roll Morton)
 "Melancoly Baby"
 "Take Me Out to the Ball Game/America" (Jack Norworth, Albert Von Tilzer)
 "Temperance Reel" (Traditional)
 "The Pineapple Rag"
 "Hick's Farewell"
 "Doctor Jazz" (King Oliver)
 "The Old Folks Polka"
 "There'll Be a Happy Meeting" (Traditional)
 "The Wreck of Old 97" (G. B. Grayson, Henry Whitter)

Personnel
 Duck Baker – acoustic guitar

Production notes:
 ED Denson – producer
 Dale Miller – producer
 Mark Needham – engineer
 Nic Kinsey – remix engineer
 Terry Eden – artwork, cover design

References

1975 debut albums
Duck Baker albums
Kicking Mule Records albums